Jack Butler may refer to:

 Jack Butler (American football) (1927–2013), American football player
 Jack Butler (artist) (born 1937), American-Canadian artist
 Jack Butler (author) (born 1944), American author
 Jack Butler (footballer, born 1868) (1868–1956), Chirk F.C. and Wales international footballer
 Jack Butler (footballer, born 1885) (1885–?), English football fullback for Grimsby Town and Plymouth Argyle
 Jack Butler (footballer, born 1894) (1894–1961), English football player and manager
 Jack Butler (Jiwarli) (1901–1986), last native speaker of Jiwarli
 Jack Butler Yeats (1871–1957), Irish artist
 Jackie Butler (born 1985), American basketball player
 Jacques Butler, American jazz musician

See also
 John Butler (disambiguation)